Chae Soo-bin (born Bae Soo-bin on July 10, 1994) is a South Korean actress. She gained recognition for her role in the television series Love in the Moonlight (2016), and transitioned into leading roles with The Rebel (2017), Strongest Deliveryman (2017), I'm Not a Robot (2017–18), Where Stars Land (2018), A Piece of Your Mind (2020), Rookie Cops (2022), and The Fabulous (2022).

Career

2014–2015: Beginnings
Chae was spotted by a casting director on the streets, and upon signing a management contract with Toin Entertainment, she proceeded to make her debut in 2014 with the film My Dictator. Due to the fact that her birth name is the same as the stage name of the more popular actor Bae Soo-bin (born Yoon Tae-wook), she was given the stage name "Chae Soo-bin". She then featured in weekend drama House of Bluebird (2015) and youth series Cheer Up! (2015) which won her Best New Actress awards at both 4th APAN Star Awards and 29th KBS Drama Awards.

2016–present: Rising popularity
Chae became recognized for her performance in the popular saeguk drama Love in the Moonlight (2016), from which she gained an Excellence Award nomination at the 30th KBS Drama Awards. The same year she starred in the play Blackbird  and the Chinese-South Korean web-drama My Catman.

In January 2017, she took on her first prime-time leading role in the historical television series The Rebel. The series was a modest success and led to a rise in popularity for Chae. She then starred in KBS2's youth romance drama Strongest Deliveryman, and MBC's romantic comedy drama I'm Not a Robot.

In 2018, Chae starred in the airport-themed drama Where Stars Land. Her performance won her the Excellence Award at the SBS Drama Awards. Chae and co-star Lee Je-hoon were also appointed honorary ambassadors of Incheon International Airport.

After the expiration of her management contract with Toin Entertainment in December 2018, Chae joined King Kong by Starship in January 2019.

In 2020, Chae starred in the romance drama A Piece of Your Mind alongside Jung Hae-in. She also starred with Jang Ki-yong in the romantic comedy film  Sweet & Sour.

In January 2022, she starred alongside Kang Daniel in the Disney+ series Rookie Cops. On May 25, 2022, Chae decided to extend her contract with King Kong by Starship. In December of that same year she starred in the Netflix series The Fabulous.

Personal life
Chae is a Catholic.

Filmography

Film

Television series

Web series

Television shows

Web shows

Music video appearances

Theater

Discography

Awards and nominations

References

External links

 
 

South Korean film actresses
South Korean stage actresses
South Korean television actresses
South Korean web series actresses
King Kong by Starship artists
1994 births
Living people
Actresses from Seoul
People from Anyang, Gyeonggi
Konkuk University alumni
South Korean Roman Catholics
21st-century South Korean actresses